Telecommunications in South Sudan includes fixed and mobile telephones, the Internet, radio, and television.

Telephone

 Calling code: +211
 International call prefix: 00
 Main lines: 
 Mobile cellular: 
 Domestic: 
 Communications cables: 
 Satellite earth stations:

Providers

{| class="wikitable"
|-
!  Operator/service provider
!  Date of licence	
!  Technology
!  Network Capacity
!  Country wide Coverage
!  Subscribers
!Operation Status
|-
| Zain South Sudan
| 1 October 2011
| GSM/UMTS/4G LTE
| unknown
| unknown
| 1,050,000
|Operational
|-
| MTN South Sudan
| 1 October 2011
| GSM/UMTS/4G LTE
| unknown
| unknown
| 1,700,000
|Operational
|-
| Gamtel South Sudan
| 1 October 2011
| GSM
| unknown
| unknown
| unknown
|Stopped
|-
| Vivacell
| 1 October 2011
| GSM/UMTS
| 2 Millions
| unknown
| unknown
|Suspended in 2018
|-
| Digitel
| 13 July 2021
| GSM/UMTS/4G LTE
| unknown
| unknown
| unknown
|Operational
|}

Internet
 Top-level domain: .ss

Radio and television

 Radio: Radio is the main source of news and information in South Sudan. Since the Comprehensive Peace Agreement of 2005, over 30 FM radio stations have been set up across the country with the encouragement of the Sudan People’s Liberation Movement (SPLM) run government. Radio networks and stations are run and funded by Government, Churches, community organizations, international NGOs and private businesses.
 Radio sets: 
 TV: The government-run SSBC TV  is based in Juba. It is the only functioning television station in the country. The SSBC TV broadcasts six hours a day in English and Arabic and can also be viewed on Satellite. The station runs a few small local TV stations in Aweil, Wau, Malakal and Rumbek. South Africa provides training for SSBC TV staff.
 TV sets:

See also

 Media of South Sudan, includes information on radio, television, and newspapers.

References